Sonja Morgan (née Tremont; born November 25, 1963) is an American television personality, socialite and philanthropist. She is popularly known for her starring role on the reality television series The Real Housewives of New York City.

Career 
Morgan studied marketing at the Fashion Institute of Technology. Her fashion line, Sonja by Sonja Morgan, was launched in 2015 and is sold at the Vanessa Noel store on East 64th Street and online. Morgan's line also retailed in Century 21 stores prior to their bankruptcy filing in 2020 following the COVID-19 pandemic. In the 1980s and 1990s, Morgan worked as an interior director, event planner, and hostess for a series of high-end Manhattan restaurants. 

In 2010, Morgan joined the cast of Bravo's hit reality television series The Real Housewives of New York City during its third season. She stayed with the show until 2021, remaining a main cast member for eleven seasons. Widely regarded as a franchise fan favorite, she was voted "Best Comedienne" in the fan-chosen Real Housewives Awards for four consecutive years, from 2015 through 2018. In 2021, celebrity video messaging platform Cameo disclosed that Morgan was among their top ten highest-earning celebrities the previous year. 

In 2017, Morgan made her off-Broadway debut in the play Sex Tips for Straight Women by a Gay Man. In 2021, she launched a regional tour of improv shows entitled Sonja In Your City, playing sold-out shows in cities including New York, Boston, Baltimore, and Washington DC. She is a frequent guest on Andy Cohen's late night chat show, Watch What Happens Live and she has made guest appearances on a number of other television series, including Difficult People, Kocktails with Khloé, and Worst Cooks in America. In 2023, she will costar in a Real Housewives spin-off series with longtime cast mate Luann de Lesseps.

A longtime philanthropist, Morgan has contributed to charities involving children, visual and performing arts, animal rights groups, and LGBTQ+ rights. She hosts cabaret and burlesque events, called Sonja in the City, that help raise money for charity. She received a Singular Sensation Award in 1990 at the St. Regis Hotel for her work alongside Vanessa Noel and Mira Sorvino. In July 2013, she received a New York State Senate Award for charity work.

Personal life 
Morgan met John Adams Morgan, a member of the prominent Morgan family, in the 1990s while working as a hostess at an Italian restaurant on Madison Avenue. They were married from 1998 until 2006. They have one daughter, Quincy Morgan. Morgan's divorce left her in financial ruin. She filed for bankruptcy, paying off creditors for four years after. She sold her house in Ramatuelle for $5.7 million, and remortgaged her $3.3 million home in New York City. Morgan also paid $6.95 million to Hannibal Pictures Incorporated after an abandoned movie project. The American Home Mortgage Servicing received $600,000 from Morgan's estate and the deed to her $5.8 million home in Telluride, Colorado.

As a public figure, Morgan has told stories of the many prominent men she dated as a young single woman in New York City. The list includes tennis player John McEnroe, actor Jack Nicholson, comedian Richard Lewis, musician Eric Clapton, and Prince Albert of Monaco, among others.

On October 13, 2016, The Huffington Post mentioned Morgan in a report on allegations of sexual misconduct made by Lisa Boyne against U.S. President Donald Trump. Boyne said Morgan invited her to a dinner with Trump, modeling agent John Casablancas, and five or six models. Boyne alleged that Trump made the models walk across the table, looked under their skirts, and described if they were wearing underwear. Morgan confirmed The Huffington Post that a dinner took place with those participants, did not recall lewd behavior by Trump, and said: "But I have been known to dance on tables."

In September 2020, Morgan spoke publicly about her experiences with cosmetic surgery, including her facelift with New York plastic surgeon Andrew Jacono.

References 

Living people
1963 births
American fashion designers
American female models
American socialites
American stage actresses
American women company founders
American women fashion designers
American women philanthropists
Fashion Institute of Technology alumni
The Real Housewives cast members
Sonja